Ground roll may refer to:
 In aviation, see takeoff
 For the surface waves during an earthquake, see Rayleigh wave